James Barry may refer to:

Politics
James Barry (Assemblyman) (1812–1883), Irish-born Wisconsin State Assemblyman
James Barry (Irish MP, 1659–1717), Irish politician
James Barry (Irish MP, 1661–1725), Irish politician
James Barry (Irish MP, 1689–1743), Irish politician
James Alexander Barry (1886–1950), Canadian politician
James G. Barry (1800–1880), Missouri politician
James J. Barry Jr. (born 1946), New Jersey politician
James Barry, 4th Earl of Barrymore (1667–1748), Irish soldier and Jacobite politician

Sports
Jimmy Barry (1870–1943), Irish-American boxer
James Barry (hurler) (born 1990), Irish hurler
James H. Barry (1884–1941), American college football coach

Other
James Barry, 1st Baron Barry of Santry (1603–1673), Irish lawyer
James Barry (painter) (1741–1806), Irish painter
James Barry (surgeon) ( 1789–1865), Irish physician in the British Army
James L. Barry, comics artist

See also
James M. Barrie (1860–1937), Scottish writer, creator of Peter Pan
James Berry (disambiguation)